XP may refer to:

Medicine
 Xanthelasma palpebrarum, a cholesterol deposit in the eyelid
 Xeroderma pigmentosum, a genetic disorder

Computing
 Windows XP, an operating system
 Microsoft Office XP, a version of the software suite
 Athlon XP, a series of AMD microprocessors
 Extreme programming, a software development methodology 
 XP, a complexity class in parameterized complexity

Technology
 Ilford XP, a chromogenic black and white film made by Ilford Photo

Gaming 
 Experience point, a unit for measuring a character's progress in role-playing games

Transport
 Boeing XP-7, a prototype United States biplane fighter of the 1920s
 Experimental pursuit, a USAAC aircraft designation, used by e.g. the Lockheed XP-38 Lightning
 Avelo Airlines (IATA code)

Other uses
 Chi Rho, a Christian symbol
 Experience point, a unit of measurement in role-playing games
 XP, an emoticon
 X phrase in linguistic theory